Karl Denson (born December 27, 1956) is an American funk and jazz saxophonist, flutist and vocalist from Santa Ana, California. He plays with the Rolling Stones and was a member of Lenny Kravitz's band and has co-founded and led The Greyboy Allstars. Denson has recorded with artists including Jack DeJohnette, Dave Holland, Slightly Stoopid, Blind Boys of Alabama, Blackalicious, Stanton Moore, and Jon Foreman of the rock band Switchfoot. He continues to lead his own Karl Denson's Tiny Universe (KDTU) and Karl Denson Trio (KD3), while touring with the Rolling Stones since 2014 to date. Denson appears in the 1988 movie Coming To America as the saxophonist in the fictional band Sexual Chocolate.

Members of KDTU include Denson (saxophone, flute), Chris Stillwell (bass), Ricio Fruge (trumpet), D. J. Williams (guitar), David Veith (keyboards), Alan Evans (drums) and Seth Freeman (guitar/lap steel)

KD3 comprises Denson with keyboardist Anthony Smith (Global Funk, Giant People) and drummer Brett Sanders (brother of John Staten).

Selected discography 
 Let Love Rule (Lenny Kravitz album) - (1989)
 Mama Said (Lenny Kravitz album) - (1991)
 Blackened Red Snapper (solo album) - (1992)
 Herbal Turkey Breast (solo album) - (1993)
 Chunky Pecan Pie (solo album) - (1994)
 West Coast Boogaloo (The Greyboy Allstars) - (1994)
 Baby Food (solo album) - (1995)
 A Town Called Earth (The Greyboy Allstars) - (1997)
 The D Stands for Diesel (solo album) - (1997)
 GBA Live (The Greyboy Allstars) - (1999)
 Dance Lesson #2 (solo album) - (2001)
 The Bridge (Karl Denson's Tiny Universe) - (2002)
 Flyin' the Koop (Stanton Moore) - (2002)
 About Time (Steve Winwood) - (2003)
 Once You're There [EP] (Karl Denson's Tiny Universe) - (2006)
 What Happened to Television? (The Greyboy Allstars) - (2007) 
 Lunar Orbit (Karl Denson Trio) - (2007)
 Brother's Keeper (Karl Denson's Tiny Universe) - (2009)
 Top of the World (Slightly Stoopid) - (2012)
 Inland Emperor (The Greyboy Allstars) - (2013)
 Time To Do Your Thing (Z-Bonics) - (2013)
 New Ammo (Karl Denson's Tiny Universe) - (2014)
 Sticky Fingers Live (The Rolling Stones) - (2015)
 Gnomes and Badgers (Karl Denson’s Tiny Universe) - (2019)
 Como De Allstars (The Greyboy Allstars) - (2020)

References

Notes
Interview at JamBase Retrieved August 26, 2007
Greyboy Allstars at AllAboutJazz Retrieved August 26, 2007
KD3 bio at JamBase
[ Karl Denson at allmusic.com] Retrieved January 29, 2009
Interview with TheWaster.com Retrieved February 10, 2014

External links
 Karl Denson website
Karl Denson Interview NAMM Oral History Library (2017)

American jazz flautists
American jazz saxophonists
American funk saxophonists
American male saxophonists
African-American jazz musicians
Jam bands
Jazz musicians from California
People from Santa Ana, California
Living people
1956 births
21st-century American saxophonists
21st-century American male musicians
American male jazz musicians
The Greyboy Allstars members
21st-century African-American musicians
20th-century African-American people
21st-century flautists